Perlak may refer to:

 Perlak, Aceh, a town in Indonesia
 Peureulak Sultanate, the historical Islamic kingdom
 Prelog, Croatia